Hamelin Laie International School is a private international school located in Montgat, Spain, near Barcelona. The school was founded in 1989 and teaches infant education, primary education, secondary education and baccalaureate.

Education
Hamelin Laie International School is a school approved by the MEC (Ministry of Education and Science of Spain). In addition, it is an IB school, since in high school it imparts the National Baccalaureate and the International Baccalaureate.

Within the school grounds is the student residence Six Lemon World, the Hamelin Laie Language School and the Dance School Laie.

References
Hamelin Laie se vuelca con Richi Talent 

Hamelin Laie entre los mejores colegios "El Mundo" 

Hamelin Laie es una IB School 

Las nuevas tecnologías en las aulas de Hamelin Laie 

Montgat estrenará escuela privada para 1.800 alumnos

External links
Official Hamelin Laie International School website
Six Lemon World, student residence of Hamelin Laie International School
Hamelin Laie Language School, language school of Hamelin Laie International School
Dansa Laie, dance school of Hamelin Laie International School

International schools in Barcelona
International Baccalaureate schools in Spain
Private schools in Spain
1989 establishments in Spain